Mâcon-Ville station (French: Gare de Mâcon-Ville) is a railway station serving Mâcon, in the Saône-et-Loire department, eastern France.

Services

The station is served by regional trains towards Beaune, Dijon, Bourg-en-Bresse and Lyon.

See also
List of SNCF stations in Bourgogne-Franche-Comté
TER Bourgogne-Franche-Comté
TER Auvergne-Rhône-Alpes

References

External links

Railway stations in France opened in 1854
Macon-Ville